Cayman Islands Open is an annual squash tournament held in April in the Cayman Islands. The women's tournament is part of the WSA World Series, the highest level of competition. The  tournament was established in 2009.

Past Results

Women's

Men's

External links
Cayman Islands Open - Squashsite website

Squash tournaments
Squash in the Cayman Islands
Recurring sporting events established in 2009